Saccharopolyspora spinosporotrichia is a Gram-positive and aerobic bacterium from the genus Saccharopolyspora which has been isolated from soil in Jiangxi in China.

References

 

Pseudonocardineae
Bacteria described in 1998